Ramornie is a national park in New South Wales, Australia, 485 km north of Sydney, and 40 km west of Grafton on the NSW North Coast.

Sixteen species of eucalyptus have been recorded in the park.

See also
 Protected areas of New South Wales

References 

National parks of New South Wales
Protected areas established in 1999
1999 establishments in Australia